Buffy studies, also called Buffyology, is the study of Joss Whedon's popular television series Buffy the Vampire Slayer and, to a lesser extent, its spin-off program Angel. It explores issues related to gender, family, ethics and other philosophical issues as expressed through the content of these shows in the fictional Buffyverse.

Neda Ulaby of NPR describes Buffy as having a "special following among academics, some of whom have staked a claim in what they call 'Buffy Studies'". Though not widely recognized as a distinct discipline, the term "Buffy studies" is commonly used amongst the academic Buffy-related writings.

Development as academic field

The original run of Buffy (1997–2003) eventually led to the publication of a number of books and hundreds of articles examining the themes of the show from a wide range of disciplinary perspectives including sociology, psychology, philosophy, theology, and women's studies. One of the first texts was written by the late David Graeber, who published the article Rebel Without a God  in 1998. Since January 2001, Slayage: The Online Journal of Buffy Studies has published essays on the topic quarterly, and it continues to do so. Fighting the Forces: What's at Stake in Buffy the Vampire Slayer was published in 2002, and since then many more Buffy books have been published by academic book publishers. There have also been a number of international conferences on the topic. "College courses across the globe are devoted to the show, and secondary schools in Australia and New Zealand also provide Buffy classes." The topic can even be undertaken as part of a Master's degree in Cult Film & TV at Brunel University, London. Increasingly, Angel is being analyzed alongside its predecessor, e.g. in the 2005 publication, Reading Angel.

The creator of Buffy, Joss Whedon, has responded to the scholarly reaction to his series: "I think it's great that the academic community has taken an interest in the show. I think it's always important for academics to study popular culture, even if the thing they are studying is idiotic. If it's successful or made a dent in culture, then it is worthy of study to find out why. Buffy, on the other hand is, I hope, not idiotic. We think very carefully about what we're trying to say emotionally, politically, and even philosophically while we're writing it... it really is, apart from being a pop-culture phenomenon, something that is deeply layered textually episode by episode."

The Third International Slayage Conference on the Whedonverses was held June 5–8, 2008 at Henderson State University in Arkadelphia, Arkansas.

The response to this scholarly attention has had its critics. Jes Battis, who authored Blood Relations in Buffy and Angel, has stated that study of the Buffyverse "invokes an uneasy combination of enthusiasm and ire", and meets "a certain amount of disdain from within the halls of the academy".

Examples of explored themes

Gender studies
Lorna Jowett, 2005: Sex and The Slayer: A Gender Studies Primer for the Buffy Fan.
In this paper, published by Wesleyan University Press, Jowett, senior lecturer in American Studies at The University of Northampton and  Buffy fan, states that ‘Buffy may be “Barbie with a kung-fu grip”, but she is still Barbie’ (p. 197).  Jowett identifies the show as being “post-feminist”, while arguing that it fails to challenge gender stereotypes in meaningful ways.  Jowetts book's first 3 chapters are entitled: Girl Power, Good Girls and Bad Girls, in which Jowett dissects the stereotypes within the female characters that, she argues, are reinforced by the show. The next three chapters are broken into the male stereotypes: Tough men, New Men and Dead Boys. Jowett states that reinforcement of stereotypes exists within the show for male characters as well.

Pop culture studies
Dee Amy-Chinn and Milly Williamson, 2005: The Vampire Spike in text and fandom: Unsettling oppositions in Buffy the Vampire Slayer.
Amy-Chinn, senior lecturer at Oxford Brookes University and Williamson, of Brunel University, focus on a specific character in this paper, Spike, who as argued by the authors, embodies “the simultaneous expression of erotic repulsion and attraction” and a “fear of and desire for the ‘other’”. The authors compare and contrast the character of Spike to the show’s general treatment of sexuality and self.

Media studies
Rhonda Wilcox, 2005: Why Buffy Matters: The Art of Buffy the Vampire Slayer.
Why does Buffy Matter?  In this paper Wilcox makes the attempt to bring this television show into perspective for us.  Wilcox says, “It matters because it shows that television can be art, and deserves to be so studied…the depth of the characters, the truth of the stories, the profundity of the themes, and their precise incarnation in language, sound and image – all of these matter.” (Wilcox 419).  While giving in depth details of all of these elements and also drawing on other academic articles about Buffy, Wilcox helps to bring this television series to the same page for all fans interested in Buffy; from those who are a bit unsure about the series all the way to those die hard fans.
Wilcox, Rhonda & Lavery, David, 2002. “Fighting the Forces: What’s at Stake for Buffy The Vampire Slayer.”
"Fighting the Forces” explores the struggle to create meaning in an impressive example of popular culture, the television series phenomenon “Buffy the Vampire Slayer”. These essays analyze the social and cultural issues implicit in the series and place it in its literary context.  Editors Wilcox and Lavery have opened an intriguing doorway to fans of this show, “Issues of gender, generations, race, class, and violence are treated seriously, through an in-depth analysis of both main characters and sidekicks. Class and race are discussed through a study of Buffy’s and her friends’ relationship with the two "other" slayers, American white trash Faith and Jamaican Kendra.”  Wilcox and Lavery analyze these many concepts while critiquing other scholarly essays such as “God, New Religious Movements, and Buffy the Vampire Slayer” and “Everything Philosophical About Buffy the Vampire Slayer.”

Family studies
 Burr, Vivien, and Jarvis, C., September 2007. “Imagining the Family Representations of Alternative Lifestyles in Buffy the Vampire Slayer.”
This paper offers studies of the family and how media families affect the views of young people.  Through the television show, Buffy the Vampire Slayer, Burr explores the dangers and advantages of non-normative family forms, especially the non-genetic or ‘chosen’ families. (Burr) There is also a focus that Buffy “endorses a non-hierarchical, ‘democratic vision’ of the family. (Giddens, 1992) Also, Buffy can generate ‘interactive social worlds’ that are a main focus of the spreading of new social, familial practices (Plummer, 1995).  Family is viewed in a new and different way through Buffy that leads to such innovations as well in practice and research on the subject.

Aesthetics
 Kociemba, David, 2006: “Actually, it explains a lot": Reading the Opening Title Sequences in Buffy the Vampire Slayer.”
This paper examines the opening title sequences of the television series in detail, looking at the use of imagery, color, editing, logo, credits, title, and scoring. The opening title sequences of Buffy the Vampire Slayer function as a microcosm of the series itself. They reveal the influence of the creators’ perception of their audience and their own work, the medium's narrative and artistic conventions, and the media industry's own practices. They construct the series’ past, shape the viewer's present experience of the episode, and prepare the way for future narratives. This article won the "Short Mr. Pointy" award for excellence in scholarship in Buffy Studies from the Whedon Studies Association.

Additional works
The full title "Buffy the Vampire Slayer" is shortened to BtVS in the following table.

{| class="wikitable sortable"
|-
!Book title
! data-sort-type=isoDate | Released
!Description
!Author(s)
|-
| The Afterlife of Genre: Remnants of the Trauerspiel in Buffy the Vampire Slayer || 2014 || An analysis, drawing on Walter Benjamin, of the hidden theology of Buffy the Vampire Slayer and the television series in general. || Anthony Curtis Adler
|-
| Buffy and Angel Conquer the Internet: Essays on Online Fandom || 2009 || A multidisciplinary examination of the two series' fandom. || Mary Kirby-Diaz (editor) 
|-
| Buffy Goes Dark || 2009 || A look at the final two seasons of BtVS, aired on UPN. || Lynne Y. Edwards, Elizabeth L. Rambo, James B. South 
|-
| Faith and Choice in the Works of Joss Whedon || 2008-04 || Exploration of the spiritual and ethical choices made in the Buffyverse by K. Dale Koontz. || K. Dale Koontz
|-
| The Existential Joss Whedon: Evil and Human Freedom in BtVS, Angel, Firefly and Serenity || 2006-04 || This book examines Joss Whedon's work in an existential light, focusing on ethics, good vs evil, choice, and free will. || Michael Richardson, J. Douglas Rabb
|-
| Aesthetics of Culture in BtVS || 2006-01 ||  Matthew Pateman's examination of the cultural commentary contained in Buffy. || Matthew Pateman
|-
| Buffy the Vampire Slayer (BFI TV Classics) || 2005-12 || Extended overview of the history of Buffy. || Anne Billson 
|-
| Why Buffy Matters || 2005-10 || Rhonda Wilcox, presents an argument for Buffy as an art form as worthy of respect and acknowledgment as film or literature. || Rhonda V. Wilcox
|-
| Reading Angel || 2005-09 || Collection covering many topics including the cinematic aesthetics of Angel, its music, shifting portrayals of masculinity, the noir Los Angeles setting, and the superhero. || Stacey Abbott (editor)
|-
| Blood Relations || 2005-06 || Explores conceptions of family explored in Buffy and Angel. || Jes Battis
|-
| Sex and the Slayer || 2005-04 || Sex and the Slayer provides an introduction to feminism through Buffy. || Lorna Jowett 
|-
| Five Seasons of Angel || 2004-10 || A science-fiction novelist and other writers contribute a collection of essays on Angel. || Glenn Yeffeth (editor)
|-
| Televised Morality: The Case of BtVS || 2004-04 || Book arguing that TV helps shapes society's moral values, and in this case specifically Buffy. || Gregory Stevenson
|-
| What Would Buffy Do: BtVS as Spiritual Guide || 2004-04 || Look at the spiritual guidelines and religious themes on display in Buffy despite the atheism of the show's creator. || Jana Riess
|-
| Reading the Vampire Slayer || 2004-03 || The book gives in-depth analysis highlighting the many hidden metaphors held within Buffy and Angel. || Roz Kaveney
|-
| Seven Seasons of Buffy || 2003-09 || A science-fiction novelist and other writers contribute a collection of essays on Buffy. || Glenn Yeffeth (editor), David Brin (Goodreads Author) (contributor), Justine Larbalestier (contributor)
|-
| Slayer Slang || 2003-07 || An in depth study on the post-modern youth language used in Buffy. || Michael Adams
|-
| Bite Me: Narrative Structures in BtVS || 2003-05 || Relating narrative structures with: audience pleasure, mise en scène, and the use of symbolism and metaphor. || Sue Turnbull 
|-
| Joss Whedon: The Genius Behind Buffy || 2003-05 || Short biography of the creator of Buffy, featuring interviews with various casts and crews he has worked with, and an analysis of his creative processes. || Candace Havens
|-
| BtVS and Philosophy || 2003-03 || Links classical philosophy to the ethics in Buffy. || James B. South, William Irwin (editor)
|-
| Fighting the Forces || 2002-04 || Looks at the struggle to examine meaning in Buffy. || Rhonda V. Wilcox (Editor), David Lavery (editor) 
|-
| Music, Sound, and Silence in BtVS || 2010-05 || This book describes the show's imaginative and widely varied use of music, sound and silence. || Paul Attinello, Janet K. Halfyard (editor), Vanessa Knights (editor) 
|-
| Once Bitten: An Unofficial Guide to the World of Angel || 2004-11 || Features a history of the show; a section profiling the best websites; a look at Buffy and Angel's recognition in academic circles; a complete episode guide to all five series of Angel; and exclusive behind-the-scenes photos. || Nikki Stafford
|-
| Bite Me! Sarah Michelle Gellar and "BtVS" || 1998-12 || Revised and updated to include information about all six seasons of Buffy, this ultimate guide to one of televisions hottest shows also includes capsule reviews of the full first three seasons of the spin-off Angel, with more emphasis put on the crossover episodes between the two shows. || Nikki Stafford
|-
| Bite Me! An Unofficial Guide to the World of BtVS || 2002-09 || BITE ME! spotlights Sarah's role in the show and features entertaining commentary on each episode, as well as background information about the stories in them (Re-released in 2008). || Nikki Stafford
|-
| Undead TV: Essays on "BtVS" || 2008-01 || 
In Undead TV, media studies scholars tackle the Buffy phenomenon and its many afterlives in popular culture, the television industry, the Internet, and academic criticism. Contributors engage with critical issues such as stardom, gender identity, spectatorship, fandom, and intertextuality.
|| Elana Levine (Editor), Lisa Parks (Editor) 
|-
| BtVS: The Monster Book || 2000-08 || This book delves into the folklore that inspired the show's bad guys - their mythology, science, cultural, literary and historical origins. || Christopher Golden, Thomas E. Sniegoski
|-
| Buffy Chronicles: The Unofficial Companion to BtVS || 1998-12 || The Buffy Chronicles includes a retrospective of the film that started it all, a history of vampire legends, cast information, plot synopses, and behind-the-scenes trivia. A guide to the alternative music and bands that add so much atmosphere, this book has everything Buffy's fans could want. || Ngaire E. Genge.
|-
| Dusted: The Unauthorized Guide to BtVS || 2010-01 || Dusted details and reviews all 144 episodes of Buffy the Vampire Slayerin exhaustive detail—with story summaries, quotes, notes on magic, character development, a rolling Slayer Kill-Count and more. || Lawrence Miles, Lars Pearson, Christa Dickson 
|-
| The Q Guide to BtVS || 2008-03 || Go behind the scenes of the smash hit television show that just won't die! From its origins as a reviled movie to its seven-year reign on the WB and UPN, Buffy spawned a new generation of vampire lovers.
|| Gregory L. Norris
|- 
| The Complete Slayer: An unofficial and unauthorised guide to every episode of BtVS || 2004-11 || Whether you're a seasoned Slayerette or a novice, this bumper guide to the complete seven series is your indispensable companion to Buffy's universe. || Keith Topping
|-
| Romance in BtVS: Love at Stake || 2014-07 || Revisits the sometimes destructive and undeniably unforgettable relationships that make up the Buffyverse. || Carrie Sessarego 
|-
| Blood, sex and education - teenage problems and fears as presented in 'BtVS''' || 2007-07 || The writer analyses how and to what extent teenager problems and highschool youth culture combined with the fantastic motif of vampirism manage to address especially a young audience. || David Gerlach 
|-
| The Fool's Journey Through Sunnydale: A Look At The Archetypes of The Major Arcana through BtVS || 2010-02 || Exploring the meanings of each Major Arcana card as depicted in lore, and in the hit television series, Buffy the Vampire Slayer. || Mary Caelsto
|-
| The Quotable Slayer (BtVS) || 2003-12 || Collection of the funniest, most telling, and often poignant quotes from the Emmy-nominated television show. || Micol Ostow (Goodreads Author), Steve Brezenoff
|-
| Hollywood Vampire: A revised and updated unofficial and unauthorised guide to Angel || 2004-01 || This unofficial fan bible is updated to include every episode of seasons three and four, encompassing the highlights of the show in categories. || Keith Topping
|-
| Buffy in the Classroom: Essays on Teaching with the Vampire Slayer || 2010-10 || This book combines the academic and practical aspects of teaching by exploring the ways in which Buffy the Vampire Slayer is taught, internationally, through both interdisciplinary and discipline-based approaches. Essays describe how Buffy can be used to explain—and encourage further discussion of—television's narrative complexity, archetypal characters, morality, feminism, identity, ethics, non-verbal communication, film production, media and culture, censorship, and Shakespeare, among other topics. || Jodie A. Kreider (editor), Meghan K. Winchell (editor)
|-
| The Physics of the Buffyverse || 2006-12 || In the tradition of the bestselling The Physics of Star Trek, acclaimed science writer Jennifer Ouellette explains fundamental concepts in the physical sciences through examples culled from the hit TV shows Buffy the Vampire Slayer and its spin-off, Angel. || Jennifer Ouellette
|- 
| Buffy, Ballads, and Bad Guys Who Sing: Music in the Worlds of Joss Whedon || 2010-11 || Buffy, Ballads, and Bad Guys Who Sing: Music in the Worlds of Joss Whedon studies the significant role that music plays in these works, from Buffy the Vampire Slayer to the internet musical Dr. Horrible's Sing-Along Blog. || Kendra Preston Leonard (editor)
|-
| The Truth of Buffy: Essays on Fiction Illuminating Reality || 2008-06 || In this collection of critical essays, 15 authors from several disciplines, including literature, the visual arts, theatre, philosophy, and political science, study ways in which Buffy illuminates viewers' real-life experiences. || Emily Dial-Driver (editor), Sally Emmons-Featherston (editor)
|-
| The Girl's Got Bite: The Original Unauthorized Guide to Buffy's World || 1998 || This companion guide covers all aspects of the Buffy phenomena-from the 1992 feature film starring Kristy Swanson and Luke Perry, to the development and production of the current hit TV series starring Sarah Michelle Gellar. || Kathleen Tracy
|-
| Redeemed: The Unauthorized Guide To Angel || 2006-11 || Redeemed critiques the entire show in berserk detail, with an eye toward reconciling the features of the "Angel"-verse against themselves, and dissecting the formidable vision of "Angel" producers Joss Whedon, Tim Minear, Jeffrey Bell and their Mutant Enemy colleagues. || Lars Pearson, Christa Dickson (Goodreads Author)
|-
|}

See also
Buffy the Vampire Slayer in popular culture
Donaldism
List of female action heroes
Women warriors in literature and culture

References

External links

Online works
Slayage: The Online International Journal of Whedon Studies - A fully electronic peer-reviewed journal dedicated to the scholarly exploration of the creative works of Joss Whedon - especially Buffy the Vampire Slayer. It is edited by David Lavery and Rhonda Wilcox. New issues appear twice yearly.
Buffy The Patriarchy Slayer  - Bibliography of scholarly articles on Buffy Studies.All Things Philosophical - A comprehensive guide to philosophy and ethics relating to the Buffyverse.
Buffyology  - Extensive bibliography of academic articles available online or in print.
Tea at the Ford  - Literary discussion of Buffy/AngelWatcher Junior  - This is a  fully electronic peer-reviewed journal devoted to publishing undergraduate scholarship on the creative works of Joss Whedon - especially Buffy the Vampire Slayer''.

References in the media
Financial Times -
Lancasteronline.com - "'Buffy' the academic slayer" 
  Alt URL
Salon.com - Report on Buffy conference (article featured on front page in November 2002) 
Ctv.ca - Scholars lecture on Buffy the Vampire Slayer

Buffyverse
Cultural studies
Science fiction studies
Third-wave feminism
Postmodern theory
Television studies